Tum Aise Hi Rehna is an Indian television drama series, which premiered on 10 November 2014 and ended on 10 April 2015. It aired Monday through Friday on Sony TV. The stars Kinshuk Mahajan and Shefali Sharma in a lead roles. The show also stars Rishika Mihani, Siddharth Vasudev, Madhura Naik, Indira Krishnan in pivotal roles. The show went off-air due to low TRPs.

Story
Riya is training to be a doctor and is interning at a hospital in Jaipur. She has been raised in a modern set-up with an open minded loving family who have encouraged her to follow her career. Riya is in love with Abhimanyu who comes from the traditional Maheshwari family where love marriage is frowned upon and women are not allowed to work after marriage. Abhimanyu's tireless efforts enable him and Riya to be married although after a number of hiccups.

Abhimanyu's mother, Rukmini, is a controlling traditional woman who agrees to the marriage to keep her son in the family but openly refuses to accept the modern Riya as her daughter-in-law. Riya's start in her marital home is difficult but she resolves to win over her mother-in-law whilst maintaining her principles.

The story changed shortly after with the introduction of Aanchal, Abhimanyu's obsessive fan who died but has now returned as an evil spirit to be with him. The story then focuses on how Aanchal puts Abhimanyu's family in danger in trying to be with him by embodying and controlling Riya's physical form for her own motives.

Cast
 Kinshuk Mahajan as Abhimanyu Maheshwari
 Shefali Sharma as Dr. Riya Agarwal / Dr. Riya Abhimanyu Maheshwari
 Madhura Naik as Aanchal
Vidhi Pandya as Kiran Maheshwari
 Indira Krishnan as Rukmini Kailash Maheshwari, Abhimanyu's mother
 Sanjay Gandhi as Kailash Maheshwari, Abhimanyu's father
 Meenakshi Verma as Dadi, Abhimanyu's grandmother
 Raj Singh Suryavanshi as Jatin Maheshwari
 Ankur Ghai as Sarthak Maheshwari
 Namrata Thapa as Sheetal Sarthak Maheshwari
 Gaurav Bajpai as Abhi's Cousin
 Siddharth Vasudev as Rajeev Kapoor
 Rishika Mihani as Anushka Rajeev Kapoor
 Mohit Chauhan as Vishesh Agarwal, Riya's father
 Sonica Handa as Lata Verma / Lata Vishesh Agarwal, Riya's mother
 Madan Tyagi

References

External links

2014 Indian television series debuts
Sony Entertainment Television original programming